A labor court (or labour court or industrial tribunal) is a governmental judiciary body which rules on labor or employment-related matters and disputes. In a number of countries, labor cases are often taken to separate national labor high courts. Other states, such as the United States, possess general non-judiciary labour relations boards which govern union certifications and elections.

List of existing labor courts
 Labour Court of Ireland
 Labour Court (Iceland)
 Federal Labor Court of Germany
 Labour Court and Labour Appeal Court of South Africa
 Labor Courts of Israel
 Labour Court of Finland
 Court of labour and Labour Court of Belgium
 Superior Labor Court and Regional Labor Courts of Brazil
 Labor Court of Monaco
 Professions Court in Quebec, Canada
 Employment Tribunal in England and Wales, United Kingdom
 Conseil de prud'hommes, in France
 Labour Court of Sweden
 Labor Court of India
 National Industrial Court of Nigeria
 Labour Court, Malaysia

Non-judicial courts or tribunals
 Fair Work Commission, Australia
 National Labor Relations Board, United States
 National Labor Relations Commission, Philippines

Labour law
Courts by type